"Summer of Love" is a song by Canadian singer Shawn Mendes and Puerto Rican record producer Tainy. It was released through Island Records on August 20, 2021. Mendes solely handles vocals, while Tainy handles production alongside Neon16 and co-producer Ido Zmishlany.

Background and promotion
On August 6, 2021, Mendes played a snippet of the song while driving a car. Two days later, which was Mendes' 23rd birthday, Mendes announced a release of the following week. Some lyrics were also teased. Mendes and Tainy announced the song on August 9, 2021. The song serves as the first collaboration between the two artists.

Accolades

Music video
The music video premiered simultaneously alongside the single on August 20, 2021. Directed by Matty Peacock, who previously worked with Mendes on the video for his 2020 single "Wonder", and filmed in Mallorca, Spain, the "dreamy visual" features the singer "experienc[ing] a care-free dream summer" and "living it up vacation style" with his friends. Scenes of them driving around in convertibles, "soaking up the sun" at the beach, swimming in the ocean, cliff jumping, and partying at a nightclub in a coastal town, are interspersed throughout. Shots of Mendes lying shirtless on a boat, and playing a guitar as he sings along to the song, are also shown.

Reception 
Joshua Espinoza of Complex wrote that the video "perfectly captures the breezy, laidback vibes of the current season". Vultures Charu Sinha commented that it "may as well be a commercial from the tourism board of Mallorca", and summarized it as "Hollister-style visuals of Mendes on a boat, Mendes on a beach, Mendes in a convertible, Mendes in a piazza, etc."

Live performances
On September 12, 2021 Mendes and Tainy performed the song for the first time together at the 2021 MTV Video Music Awards. Mendes performed the song solo at BBC Radio 1's Live Lounge on September 14.

Credits and personnel
Credits adapted from Tidal.

 Shawn Mendes – vocals, songwriting
 Tainy – production, songwriting, programming, mixing, studio personnel
 Neon16 
 Alejandro Borrero – production, songwriting
 Ivanni Rodríguez – production, songwriting
 Ido Zmishlany – co-production, songwriting, recording, studio personnel
 Scott Harris – songwriting
 Solly – songwriting
 Aldae – songwriting
 Randy Class – songwriting
 Andrew Jackson – songwriting
 Chris Gehringer – mastering, studio personnel
 Natalia Ramirez – vocal engineering, studio personnel

Charts

Weekly charts

Year-end charts

Certifications

Release history

References

2021 singles
2021 songs
Shawn Mendes songs
Song recordings produced by Tainy
Songs written by Ido Zmishlany
Songs written by Scott Harris (songwriter)
Songs written by Shawn Mendes
Songs written by Tainy
Tainy songs
Songs written by Gregory Hein